Rabindra Sadan is one of the busiest metro stations of the Kolkata Metro. It is named after the nearby Rabindra Sadan cultural centre and theatre. The station is located at the junction of Chowringhee Road and AJC Bose Road.

History

Construction

The station

Structure
Rabindra Sadan is underground metro station, situated on the Kolkata Metro Line 1 of Kolkata Metro.

Station layout

Connections

See also

Kolkata
List of Kolkata Metro stations
Transport in Kolkata
Kolkata Metro Rail Corporation
Kolkata Suburban Railway
Kolkata Monorail
Trams in Kolkata
Bhowanipore
Chowringhee Road
List of rapid transit systems
List of metro systems

References

External links

 
 
 Official Website for line 1
 UrbanRail.Net – descriptions of all metro systems in the world, each with a schematic map showing all stations.

Kolkata Metro stations
Railway stations opened in 1984
Railway stations in Kolkata